Charleston is an unincorporated community in Gray County, Kansas, United States.

History
Charleston was a station and shipping point on the Atchison, Topeka and Santa Fe Railway.

A post office was opened in Charleston in 1908, closed temporarily in 1912, reopened in 1913, and was closed permanently in 1944.

References

Further reading

External links
 Gray County maps: Current, Historic, KDOT

Unincorporated communities in Gray County, Kansas
Unincorporated communities in Kansas